Bastiaan Johannis "Bas" van der Vlies (29 June 1942 – 7 November 2021) was a Dutch politician of the Reformed Political Party (SGP) and teacher.

He was an MP from 10 June 1981 to 17 June 2010. He was also both Parliamentary leader and Leader of the Reformed Political Party from 22 May 1986 to 10 May 2010. Van der Vlies obtained a hydraulic engineering degree from the Delft University of Technology. He worked as a maths teacher before becoming a politician.

Decorations

References

External links

Official
  Ir. B.J. (Bas) van der Vlies Parlement & Politiek

 

 

 

1942 births
2021 deaths
Delft University of Technology alumni
Dutch Calvinist and Reformed Christians
Knights of the Order of the Netherlands Lion
Knights of the Order of Orange-Nassau
Leaders of the Reformed Political Party
Members of the House of Representatives (Netherlands)
People from De Bilt
People from Sliedrecht
Reformed Political Party politicians
20th-century Dutch educators
20th-century Dutch engineers
20th-century Dutch politicians
21st-century Dutch politicians
Deaths from cancer in the Netherlands